Acetylene

Propyne

1-Butyne

In organic chemistry, an alkyne is an unsaturated hydrocarbon containing at least one carbon—carbon triple bond. The simplest acyclic alkynes with only one triple bond and no other functional groups form a homologous series with the general chemical formula  . Like other hydrocarbons, alkynes are generally hydrophobic.

Structure and bonding
In acetylene, the H–C≡C bond angles are 180°. By virtue of this bond angle, alkynes are rod-like. Correspondingly, cyclic alkynes are rare. Benzyne cannot be isolated. The C≡C bond distance of 121 picometers is much shorter than the C=C distance in alkenes (134 pm) or the C–C bond in alkanes (153 pm).

The triple bond is very strong with a bond strength of 839 kJ/mol. The sigma bond contributes 369 kJ/mol, the first pi bond contributes 268 kJ/mol and the second pi-bond of 202 kJ/mol bond strength. Bonding usually discussed in the context of molecular orbital theory, which recognizes the triple bond as arising from overlap of s and p orbitals. In the language of valence bond theory, the carbon atoms in an alkyne bond are sp hybridized: they each have two unhybridized p orbitals and two sp hybrid orbitals. Overlap of an sp orbital from each atom forms one sp–sp sigma bond. Each p orbital on one atom overlaps one on the other atom, forming two pi bonds, giving a total of three bonds. The remaining sp orbital on each atom can form a sigma bond to another atom, for example to hydrogen atoms in the parent acetylene. The two sp orbitals project on opposite sides of the carbon atom.

Terminal and internal alkynes
Internal alkynes feature carbon substituents on each acetylenic carbon. Symmetrical examples include diphenylacetylene and 3-hexyne.

Terminal alkynes have the formula . An example is methylacetylene (propyne using IUPAC nomenclature). Terminal alkynes, like acetylene itself, are mildly acidic, with pKa values of around 25. They are far more acidic than alkenes and alkanes, which have pKa values of around 40 and 50, respectively. The acidic hydrogen on terminal alkynes can be replaced by a variety of groups resulting in halo-, silyl-, and alkoxoalkynes. The carbanions generated by deprotonation of terminal alkynes are called acetylides.

Naming alkynes
In systematic chemical nomenclature, alkynes are named with the Greek prefix system without any additional letters. Examples include ethyne or octyne. In parent chains with four or more carbons, it is necessary to say where the triple bond is located. For octyne, one can either write 3-octyne or oct-3-yne when the bond starts at the third carbon. The lowest number possible is given to the triple bond. When no superior functional groups are present, the parent chain must include the triple bond even if it is not the longest possible carbon chain in the molecule. Ethyne is commonly called by its trivial name acetylene.

In chemistry, the suffix -yne is used to denote the presence of a triple bond. In organic chemistry, the suffix often follows IUPAC nomenclature. However, inorganic compounds featuring unsaturation in the form of triple bonds may be denoted by substitutive nomenclature with the same methods used with alkynes (i.e. the name of the corresponding saturated compound is modified by replacing the "-ane" ending with "-yne"). "-diyne" is used when there are two triple bonds, and so on. The position of unsaturation is indicated by a numerical locant immediately preceding the "-yne" suffix, or 'locants' in the case of multiple triple bonds. Locants are chosen so that the numbers are low as possible. "-yne" is also used as an infix to name substituent groups that are triply bound to the parent compound.

Sometimes a number between hyphens is inserted before it to state which atoms the triple bond is between. This suffix arose as a collapsed form of the end of the word "acetylene". The final "-e" disappears if it is followed by another suffix that starts with a vowel.

Structural isomerism 
Alkynes having four or more carbon atoms can form different structural isomers by having the triple bond in different positions or having some of the carbon atoms be substituents rather than part of the parent chain. Other non-alkyne structural isomers are also possible.
 : acetylene only
 : propyne only
 : 2 isomers: 1-butyne, and 2-butyne 
 : 3 isomers: 1-pentyne, 2-pentyne, and 3-methyl-butyne
 : 7 isomers: 1-hexyne, 2-hexyne, 3-hexyne, 4-methyl-1-pentyne, 4-methyl-2-pentyne, 3-methyl-1-pentyne, 3,3-dimethyl-1-butyne

Synthesis

Cracking
Commercially, the dominant alkyne is acetylene itself, which is used as a fuel and a precursor to other compounds, e.g., acrylates. Hundreds of millions of kilograms are produced annually by partial oxidation of natural gas:
 2 CH4 + 3/2 O2 -> HC#CH + 3 H2O
Propyne, also industrially useful, is also prepared by thermal cracking of hydrocarbons.

Dehydrohalogenation and related reactions
Alkynes are prepared from 1,2- and 1,1-alkyl dihalides by double dehydrohalogenation. The reaction provides a means to generate alkynes from alkenes, which are first halogenated and then dehydrohalogenated. For example, phenylacetylene can be generated from styrene by bromination followed by treatment of the resulting of styrene dibromide with sodium amide in ammonia:

Via the Fritsch–Buttenberg–Wiechell rearrangement, alkynes are prepared from vinyl bromides. Alkynes can be prepared from aldehydes using the Corey–Fuchs reaction and from aldehydes or ketones by the Seyferth–Gilbert homologation.  

Vinyl chlorides are susceptible to dehydrochlorination.  Vinyl chlorides are available from aldehydes using the reagent (chloromethylene)triphenylphosphorane.

Reactions, including applications
Featuring a reactive functional group, alkynes participate in many organic reactions. Such use was pioneered by Ralph Raphael, who in 1955 wrote the first book describing their versatility as intermediates in synthesis.

Hydrogenation
Being more unsaturated than alkenes, alkynes characteristically undergo reactions that show that they are "doubly unsaturated". Depending on catalysts and conditions, alkynes add one or two equivalents of hydrogen. Partial hydrogenation, stopping after the addition of only one equivalent to give the alkene, is usually more desirable since alkanes are less useful:

The largest scale application of this technology is the conversion of acetylene to ethylene in refineries (the steam cracking of alkanes yields a few percent acetylene, which is selectively hydrogenated in the presence of a palladium/silver catalyst). For more complex alkynes, the Lindlar catalyst is widely recommended to avoid formation of the alkane, for example in the conversion of phenylacetylene to styrene. Similarly, halogenation of alkynes gives the alkene dihalides or alkyl tetrahalides:

RCH=CR'H + H2 -> RCH2CR'H2

Addition of halogens and related reagents
Alkynes characteristically are capable of adding two equivalents of halogens and hydrogen halides. 
RC#CR' + 2 Br2 -> RCBr2CR'Br2

The addition of nonpolar  bonds across  is general for silanes, boranes, and related hydrides. The hydroboration of alkynes gives vinylic boranes which oxidize to the corresponding aldehyde or ketone. In the thiol-yne reaction the substrate is a thiol.

Addition of hydrogen halides has long been of interest. In the presence of mercuric chloride as a catalyst, acetylene and hydrogen chloride react to give vinyl chloride. While this method has been abandoned in the West, it remains the main production method in China.

Hydration
The hydration reaction of acetylene gives acetaldehyde.  The reaction proceeds by formation of vinyl alcohol, which undergoes tautomerizes to form the aldehyde. This reaction was once a major industrial process but it has been displaced by the Wacker process. This reaction occurs in nature, the catalyst being acetylene hydratase.

The hydration of phenylacetylene gives acetophenone, and the  catalyzed hydration of 1,8-nonadiyne to 2,8-nonanedione:
PhC#CH + H2O -> PhCOCH3
HC#C(CH2)5C#CH + 2H2O -> CH3CO(CH2)5COCH3

Tautomerism
Terminal alkyl alkynes exhibit tautomerism.  Propyne exists in equilibrium with propadiene:
HC#C-CH3 <=> CH2=C=CH2

Cycloadditions and oxidation
Alkynes undergo diverse cycloaddition reactions. The Diels–Alder reaction with 1,3-dienes  give 1,4-cyclohexadienes. This general reaction has been extensively developed. Electrophilic alkynes are especially effective dienophiles. The "cycloadduct" derived from the addition of alkynes to 2-pyrone eliminates carbon dioxide to give the aromatic compound. Other specialized cycloadditions include multicomponent reactions such as alkyne trimerisation to give aromatic compounds and the [2+2+1]-cycloaddition of an alkyne, alkene and carbon monoxide in the Pauson–Khand reaction. Non-carbon reagents also undergo cyclization, e.g. Azide alkyne Huisgen cycloaddition to give triazoles. Cycloaddition processes involving alkynes are often catalyzed by metals, e.g. enyne metathesis and alkyne metathesis, which allows the scrambling of carbyne (RC) centers:
RC#CR + R'C#CR' <=> 2RC#CR'
Oxidative cleavage of alkynes proceeds via cycloaddition to metal oxides. Most famously, potassium permanganate converts alkynes to a pair of carboxylic acids.

Reactions specific for terminal alkynes
Terminal alkynes are readily converted to many derivatives, e.g. by coupling reactions and condensations.  Via the condensation with formaldehyde and acetylene is produced butynediol:  
2CH2O + HC#CH  ->  HOCH2CCCH2OH

In the Sonogashira reaction, terminal alkynes are coupled with aryl or vinyl halides:

This reactivity exploits the fact that terminal alkynes are weak acids, whose typical pKa values around 25 place them between that of ammonia (35) and ethanol (16):
RC#CH + MX -> RC#CM + HX
where MX = NaNH2, LiBu, or RMgX.

The reactions of alkynes with certain metal cations, e.g.  and  also gives acetylides. Thus, few drops of diamminesilver(I) hydroxide reacts with terminal alkynes signaled by formation of a white precipitate of the silver acetylide.  This reactivity is the basis of alkyne coupling reactions, including the Cadiot–Chodkiewicz coupling, Glaser coupling, and the Eglinton coupling: 

2R-\!{\equiv}\!-H ->[\ce{Cu(OAc)2}][\ce{pyridine}] R-\!{\equiv}\!-\!{\equiv}\!-R

In the Favorskii reaction and in alkynylations in general, terminal alkynes add to carbonyl compounds to give the hydroxyalkyne.

Metal complexes

Alkynes form complexes with transition metals. Such complexes occur also in metal catalyzed reactions of alkynes such as alkyne trimerization.  Terminal alkynes, including acetylene itself, react with water to give aldehydes.  The transformation typically requires metal catalysts to give this anti-Markovnikov addition result.

Alkynes in nature and medicine
According to Ferdinand Bohlmann, the first naturally occurring acetylenic compound, dehydromatricaria ester, was isolated from an Artemisia species in 1826. In the nearly two centuries that have followed, well over a thousand naturally occurring acetylenes have been discovered and reported. Polyynes, a subset of this class of natural products, have been isolated from a wide variety of plant species, cultures of higher fungi, bacteria, marine sponges, and corals. Some acids like tariric acid contain an alkyne group. Diynes and triynes, species with the linkage RC≡C–C≡CR′ and RC≡C–C≡C–C≡CR′ respectively, occur in certain plants (Ichthyothere, Chrysanthemum, Cicuta, Oenanthe and other members of the Asteraceae and Apiaceae families). Some examples are cicutoxin, oenanthotoxin, and falcarinol . These compounds are highly bioactive, e.g. as nematocides. 1-Phenylhepta-1,3,5-triyne is illustrative of a naturally occurring triyne.

Alkynes occur in some pharmaceuticals, including the contraceptive noretynodrel. A carbon–carbon triple bond is also present in marketed drugs such as the antiretroviral Efavirenz and the antifungal Terbinafine. Molecules called ene-diynes feature a ring containing an alkene ("ene") between two alkyne groups ("diyne"). These compounds, e.g. calicheamicin, are some of the most aggressive antitumor drugs known, so much so that the ene-diyne subunit is sometimes referred to as a "warhead". Ene-diynes undergo rearrangement via the Bergman cyclization, generating highly reactive radical intermediates that attack DNA within the tumor.

See also

 -yne
 cycloalkyne

References